Open Sky is a progressive rock album by Iona, released in 2000.

Recording
Recordings were made at various locations during 1999 and 2000, all engineered by Nigel Palmer:
 Chapel Studios, Lincolnshire
 Visions on Albion, Yorkshire
 The Snooker Roon, Northern Ireland

Track listing
Disc 1 – total time 73:30
 "Woven Cord" – 9:28
 "Wave After Wave" – 6:15
 "Open Sky" – 5:40
 "Castlerigg" – 9:27
 "A Million Stars" – 3:20
 "Light Reflected" – 5:11
 "Hinba" – 4:58
 "Songs of Ascent" (part 1) – 7:58
 "Songs of Ascent" (part 2) – 9:06
 "Songs of Ascent" (part 3) – 4:53
 "Friendship's Door" – 7:14

Personnel

Band
 Joanne Hogg – vocals, piano, keyboards
 Dave Bainbridge – guitars, keyboards, e-bow and Indian guitars, piano, bouzouki, autoharp, vocals
 Phil Barker – bass guitar
 Frank Van Essen – drums, percussion, violins, vocals
 Troy Donockley – Uilleann pipes, low whistles, tin whistle, vocals, acoustic guitar, e-bow guitar, Portuguese mandola, harmonium

Additional musician and special guest
 Billy Jackson – Celtic harp, clarsach

Release details
 2000, UK, Alliance Records ALD 1901772, release date 8 May 2000, CD
 2000, US, Forefront Records FFD-5285, release date 8 May 2000, CD
 2005, UK, Open Sky Records OPENVP8CD, release date 27 June 2005, CD

Iona (band) albums
2000 albums